The Bande Mataram was an English language weekly newspaper published from Calcutta (now Kolkata) founded in 1905 by Bipin Chandra Pal and edited by Sri Aurobindo.

Its aim was to prepare Indians to struggle for complete independence. It was a daily organ of Indian nationalism. It was accused of spreading 'radical Indian nationalism' and 'Nationalist Extremism'. According to S. K. Ratcliffe, a previous editor of The Statesman, in a letter to the Manchester Guardian of 28 December 1950, "It had a full-size sheet, was clearly printed on green paper, and was full of leading and special articles written in English with a brilliance and pungency not hitherto attained in the Indian Press. It was the most effective voice of what we then called nationalist extremism."

The two decades of increasing influence of journals such as Bande Mataram in Bengal, and similar journals emerging in the United Provinces led to a strict government censorship under the Press Act 1910.

References

Sources
 The Making of India: A Historical Survey, by Ranbir Vohra.2000. M.E. Sharpe..p 111
 A History of Indian Literature in English, by Arvind Krishna Mehrotra.2003. C. Hurst & Co. Publishers. .p 118
 The Essential Aurobindo, by Robert A. McDermott. 1988. SteinerBooks. . p43
 The Hour of God: Selections From His Writings, by Manoj Das.1995 Sahitya Akademi..p v

External links
Sri Aurobindo's Political Life (1906-1910) : Editor of Bande Mataram Newspaper
Bande Mataram materials in the South Asian American Digital Archive (SAADA)
The Bande Mataram – Monthly Organ of Indian Independence 1913–1914, library Villanova University

Anushilan Samiti
Revolutionary movement for Indian independence
Newspapers published in Kolkata
English-language newspapers published in India
Literature of Indian independence movement
Publications established in 1905
1905 establishments in India